S32212 is a drug which is under preclinical investigation as a potential antidepressant medicine. It behaves as a selective, combined 5-HT2C receptor inverse agonist and α2-adrenergic receptor antagonist (at all three subtypes—α2A, α2B, and α2C) with additional 5-HT2A and, to a lesser extent, 5-HT2B receptor antagonistic properties, and lacks any apparent affinity for the monoamine reuptake transporters or for the α1-adrenergic, H1, or mACh receptors. This profile of activity is compatible with the definition of a noradrenergic and specific serotonergic antidepressant (NaSSA), and as such, S32212 could in turn be classified as a NaSSA if it reaches the market.

In animal studies, S32212 raised BDNF concentrations in the hippocampus and amygdala, increased the firing rate of neurons in the adrenergic perikarya in the locus coeruleus, increased levels of norepinephrine in the frontal cortex and hippocampus, and elevated frontal cortex levels of dopamine and acetylcholine, though not of serotonin or histamine. It produces effects indicative of antidepressant, anxiolytic, antiobsessional, antiaggressive, and cognitive- and sleep-enhancing properties in animal models, all while not perturbing body weight or sexual behavior.

See also 
 Noradrenergic and specific serotonergic antidepressant

References 

Alpha-2 blockers
Carboxamides
Indolines
Noradrenergic and specific serotonergic antidepressants
Phenylpiperazines
Serotonin receptor antagonists